William Marbury (November 7, 1762 – March 13, 1835) was a highly successful American businessman and one of the "Midnight Judges" appointed by United States President John Adams the day before he left office. He was the plaintiff in the landmark 1803 Supreme Court case Marbury v. Madison.

Background
Marbury, son of William and Martha (Marlowe) Marbury, was born November 7, 1762 in Piscataway, Maryland. He spent most of his early life in Maryland around his home.

Career
Marbury became a Georgetown businessman and member of the Federalist Party. In an effort to prevent the incoming party from dismantling his Federalist Party-dominated government, Adams issued 42 judicial appointments, including Marbury's as Justice of the Peace in the District of Columbia, on March 3, 1801, the day before he turned his government over to incoming President Thomas Jefferson. Marbury had actively campaigned for Adams (and against Jefferson) in the presidential election of 1800.  Jefferson refused to honor Adams' appointments on the grounds that Adams' paperwork had not been delivered to the proper offices before the change of administration had taken place. Marbury then sued Jefferson's secretary of state, James Madison, in the Supreme Court, asking it issue a writ of mandamus to force the Jefferson administration to honor Adams' appointments.

Marbury's suit led to the Supreme Court case Marbury v Madison, which utilized the power of Judicial review in its decision. Supreme Court Chief Justice John Marshall didn't offer Marbury a legal remedy. Marshall's two-pronged decision averred that while the Court did not have the authority to issue the writ Marbury had requested, it did have the authority to review the constitutionality of actions of the federal executive and legislative branches of government, including those of the Adams and Jefferson administrations.

Whilst the case also held that President Adams' signed commissioned in itself "vested a legal right" - that is, legal title - as a Justice of the Peace (implying he was entitled to pay from that date), Marbury never actually exercised that judicial office. Rather he continued a successful career in finance (banking and securities trading).

Personal life
Marbury died on March 13, 1835. He was buried at Oak Hill Cemetery in Washington, D.C.

Legacy
Marbury's former home in Georgetown is now known as "Forrest-Marbury House" and serves as the Ukrainian Embassy to the United States.  Chief Justice Warren Burger placed portraits of William Marbury and James Madison in the small dining room of the Supreme Court, and designated the room "the John Marshall room".

Descendants include William L. Marbury, Jr. (1901–1988) of Baltimore, Maryland.

See also

 Marbury v. Madison 
  William L. Marbury, Jr. (probable descendant)

References

External links

1762 births
American judges
1835 deaths
Maryland lawyers
People from Prince George's County, Maryland
People from Georgetown (Washington, D.C.)
19th-century American lawyers
Burials at Oak Hill Cemetery (Washington, D.C.)